Hypocrita celadon is a moth of the family Erebidae. It was described by Pieter Cramer in 1777. It is found in Argentina, French Guiana, Suriname and Nicaragua.

References

 

Hypocrita
Moths described in 1777